Barbara A. Romanowicz (born 5 April 1950) is a French geophysicist and an expert on imaging the earth's interior.

Early life 
Romanowicz was born in Suresnes, France.

Barbara Romanowicz is the daughter of Kazimierz Romanowicz and Zofia Romanowiczowa. The first years of Barbara's life were an inspiration for Zofia Romanowiczowa's debut novel entitled Baśka and Barbara.

Education 
Romanowicz received a BSc degree in mathematics from the Ecole Normale Supérieure, a MSc in applied physics from Harvard University and PhDs in astronomy from Pierre and Marie Curie University and in geophysics from Paris Diderot University.

Career 
From 1979 to 1981, Romanowicz was a postdoctoral research assistant at the Massachusetts Institute of Technology. From 1982 to 1990, while working as a researcher at the Centre national de la recherche scientifique (CNRS), she developed a global network of seismic stations known as GEOSCOPE to study earthquakes and the interior structure of the earth. From 1990 to 2011, she was director of the Berkeley Seismological Laboratory; she was also a professor in the Earth and Planetary Science department at the University of California, Berkeley. During her time at the Berkeley laboratory, she helped develop a real-time earthquake notification system for northern California. In 2011 she was named to the chair of Physics of the Earth Interior at the Collège de France, where she regularly organises symposiums on topics related to the evolution of the Earth.

She has been European editor for Geophysical Research Letters and editor for Physics of the Earth and Planetary Interiors.

She is the founder of Cooperative Institute for Dynamic Earth Research (CIDER), which was established with the goal to engage geoscientist on multidisciplinary research.

From 2011 to 2020, she was professor at the Collège de France (Paris) in the chair "Physique de l'intérieur de la Terre".

In 2019, Romanowicz received the William Bowie Medal for "outstanding contributions for fundamental geophysics and for unselfish cooperation in research". Her citation includes:

Honors and awards

 1990 Fellow, American Geophysical Union
 1992 Silver Medal of the Centre National de la Recherche Scientifique
 1999  of the European Union of Geosciences
 2001 Fellow, American Academy of Arts and Sciences
 2003 Gutenberg Medal, European Geophysical Society

 2005 Member, National Academy of Sciences
 2008 Chevalier de la Légion d'Honneur, France 
 2009 Inge Lehmann Medal of the American Geophysical Union
 2010 Miller Professor, University of California, Berkeley  
 2011 Harry Reid Medal of the Seismological Society of America

 2013 Elected Member, Académie des Sciences, France
 2019 William Bowie Medal of the American Geophysical Union
 2020 Wollaston Medal of the Geological Society of London

Personal life 
In 1979, Romanowicz married Mark Jonikas.

References 

1950 births
Living people
French geophysicists
Harvard University alumni
University of California, Berkeley faculty
Members of the United States National Academy of Sciences